We Are Syrians is an autobiographical memoir by Sana Mustafa, Naila Al Atrash, and Radwan Ziadeh.

It was published in 2017 by University of New Orleans Press and was edited by Adam Braver and Abby Deveuve. Both editors worked at the Scholars at Risk Network.

The book is the fourth in a series of publications by University of New Orleans Press called "Broken Silence".

Plot 
The book documents the lives of three generations of Syrian dissidents. It starts with theatre director Naila Al Atrash, who after studying in Bulgaria returned to Syria to organize political theatre. Al Atrash is the granddaughter of Sultan Pasha al-Atrash a famous military hero of the first Syrian Revolution.

The second part of the book is about Radwan Ziadeh who grew up in Syria as it was being controlled by President Bashar al-Assad. Originally a dentist, Ziadeh became an intellectual who took part in the 2000 Damascus Spring.

The third part follows the story of Sana Mustafa. Mustafa, a university student in Damascus, takes part in peaceful protests against the government of Bashar al-Assad. While on an educational exchange program in USA she is notified by text message that her father is detained and that her family are fleeing to Turkey. She applies for and received political asylum in USA and completes her education at Bard College.

Writing style 
We are Syrians is presented as first-person narratives which was put together from a series of interviews.

Reception 
We are Syrians was described as "compelling" by Maryam Rafiee writing in Kirkus Reviews and by academic reviewer Edward Fitzpatrick.

Rebecca Foster, writing for Foreword Reviews complimented the editors for letting the three subjects tell their own stories and noted that the book is likely provoke increased empathy from western readers towards people affected by the Syria Civil War.

References

External links 

 Official website
Scholars at Risk Network

Books about Syria
2017 non-fiction books
Syrian literature
Books about war
Books published by university presses of the United States